The 1948–49 Maltese First Division was the 34th season of top-tier football in Malta.  It was contested by 8 teams, and Sliema Wanderers F.C. won the championship.

The team managed to gain the top of the leaderboard only on the penultimate day, after winning by 1-0 a decisive clash against the historical rivals of Floriana.

League standings

Relegation tie-breaker
With both St. George's and Naxxar Lions level on 6 points, a play-off match was conducted to determine 8th place and the relegation.

Results

References

External links
Malta - List of final tables (RSSSF)

Maltese Premier League seasons
Malta 
Premier